Laubuka siamensis is a species of cyprinid fish endemic to Thailand.

References

Laubuka
Danios
Fish of Thailand
Taxa named by Henry Weed Fowler
Fish described in 1939